Princess Lily may refer to:

 Princess lily (Alstroemeria psittacina), an ornamental plant
 Himeyuri students, or Lily Princesses, a nursing unit for the Imperial Japanese Army during the Battle of Okinawa in 1945
 Ice Princess Lily, American version of Tabaluga, a German animated fantasy family film, featuring Princess Lilli
 Princess Lily, a fictional character in the 2009 Jessica Day George novel Princess of the Midnight Ball
 Princess Lily Wentworth, a fictional character from the 2011 Heather Dixon novel Entwined
 Luziannan princess Lily Borjarno, a fictional character from Turn A Gundam, 1999

See also

 Lily (disambiguation)
 List of fictional princesses